Howickia is a genus of flies belonging to the family Lesser Dung flies.

Species
H. trilineata (Hutton, 1901)

References

Sphaeroceridae
Diptera of Australasia
Brachycera genera